Isopavine is an alkaloid.

See also
 Pavine, a related alkaloid

References

Benzylisoquinoline alkaloids
Methoxy compounds
Nitrogen heterocycles
Heterocyclic compounds with 4 rings